Sabir Kabliwala (also known as Sabir Khedawala) (born in Jamalpur, 15 January 1964) is an Indian politician from Gujarat, India. He was the Member of the Legislative Assembly from Jamalpur Constituency (Vidhan Sabha constituency) of Gujarat Legislative Assembly.

Early life and career 
Sabir Kabliwala was born in Jamalpur to a Muslim family. His father's name is Mr. Abdulkarim. Kabliwala's spouse's profession is handicrafts.

Political career 
Kabiwala won the State Assembly (Vidhan Sabha) Elections in 2007 with 44,870 total votes as a member of the Indian National Congress.

See also 
 Gujarat Legislative Assembly
 Vidhan Sabha

References 

1964 births
Living people
People from Jamalpur District
21st-century Indian politicians
Indian National Congress politicians from Gujarat
All India Majlis-e-Ittehadul Muslimeen politicians